Robert Kururangi (born 4 July 1957) is a former New Zealand rugby union player. A wing, Kururangi represented Counties at a provincial level, and was a member of the New Zealand national side, the All Blacks, on their 1978 tour of Britain and Ireland. He played eight matches, scoring four tries, on that tour, but did not appear in any internationals. He also took part in the 1982 New Zealand Māori rugby union tour of Wales and Spain.

References

1957 births
Living people
Rugby union players from Gisborne, New Zealand
People educated at Gisborne Boys' High School
New Zealand rugby union players
New Zealand international rugby union players
Counties Manukau rugby union players
Rugby union wings
Māori All Blacks players